Alick Grant (11 August 1916 – 2008) was an English footballer who played in the Football League for Aldershot, Leicester City, Derby County, Newport County and York City.

External links
 Alick Grant stats at Neil Brown stat site

English footballers
English Football League players
1916 births
2008 deaths
Sheffield United F.C. players
Bury F.C. players
Aldershot F.C. players
Leicester City F.C. players
Derby County F.C. players
Newport County A.F.C. players
Leeds United F.C. players
York City F.C. players
Worksop Town F.C. players
Association football goalkeepers
People from Radstock